The Rev. Scott Claassen is an Episcopal priest and musician currently serving as chaplain and vicar of St. Michael's University Church in Santa Barbara, California. Following studies at Yale Divinity School, Claassen embarked on a yearlong Carbon Sabbath during which he refrained from driving or flying while bicycling over 11,500 miles around the United States engaging Christian communities in dialogue about climate change.

A lifelong multi-instrumentalist musician and songwriter, Claassen has penned hundreds of songs and appeared on dozens of records. Throughout his solo career he has released 8 studio albums and 3 EP's. His songs have been featured in Grey's Anatomy and in several films. His primary instruments are guitar, mandolin, and piano, but he also plays harmonica, banjo, charango, and a variety of other strings and keyboard instruments.

Spiritual life

Carbon Sabbath 
In 2011, Claassen completed his Master of Divinity from Yale Divinity School. Having investigated the relationship between faith and the environment at Yale's Forum for Religion and Ecology during his graduate studies, he was inspired to take a Carbon Sabbath. He would spend one year without flying or driving as well as eating a primarily plant-based diet and refraining from consumer demands like online shopping. During that period, Claassen bicycled over 11,500 miles around the United States to engage Christian communities of a variety of traditions in dialogue about climate change. The journey started and ended at his home church Thad's in Santa Monica, California. From there, he cycled north to Seattle, East to Washington, D.C., south to Jacksonville, and back to California. He also kept a blog of the journey.

Laundry Love Ordination 
In April 2014, Claassen was ordained to the Episcopal diaconate in a laundromat as part of Thad's monthly Laundry Love ministry. Laundry Love is a nationwide phenomenon in which communities of faith and other organizations offer free laundry services to anyone in need. The ordination drew national attention to Laundry Love. Later that year, Claassen was ordained to the Episcopal priesthood at Thad's, an Episcopal church located in Santa Monica, California.

Surfing and Spirituality 
While serving as the Episcopal chaplain to the University of California Santa Barbara (UCSB), Claassen started the Surfing & Spirituality program. This weekly group brings students together to surf and explore surfing as a spiritual practice. It meets Wednesday mornings, and it is open to all university students regardless of religious affiliation. The group has been featured in the Santa Barbara Independent, Living Lutheran magazine, and several publications in the Episcopal Church.

Music career

Collaborations 
During undergraduate in Nashville, Claassen played harmonica, mandolin, and keyboards in the jam band On the 8's. He also played mandolin and harmonica with The Lost Trailers and had songwriting credit on their album Welcome to the Woods.

While working as an outdoor guide in Austin, Texas, he played Fender Rhodes and trumpet with The Glass Family.

While living in Los Angeles, he played keyboards and vocals in The Broken West.

Solo career 
As a solo artist, Claassen has released 8 LP's, 3 EP's, and a variety of singles. His 2007 album Shiny Car in the Night includes soundbites from interviews conducted in 2006 with people across the country about the American Dream. His 2019 Big Sur Suite is a live recording of primary piano quintets and other instrumental music. In 2020, Claassen released the single "The Day John Prine Died" in honor of John Prine, the critically acclaimed songwriter who passed and in reflection upon the pandemic experience. Claassen's 2022 record Alpine is an investigation into life in and around the mountains.

Discography

Albums 
Monterey (2005)
Shiny Car in the Night (2007)
Indio Sun (2010)
Temas en Blue (2014)
Camino Real (2018)
Lost Valentines (2018)
Carbon Cycle EP (2018)
Big Sur Suite (2019)
Alpine (2022)

Singles 
"The Day John Prine Died" (2020)
"I Have Been to the Mountaintop" (2022)
"All Along" (2018)

References 

Living people
1979 births
Americana musicians
Yale Divinity School alumni
21st-century American Episcopal priests
Musicians from Santa Barbara, California
American environmentalists
University of California, Santa Barbara people
American indie rock musicians
21st-century American singers
21st-century American male singers
21st-century American keyboardists
American mandolinists
21st-century American guitarists